Nindu Manasulu is a 1967 Indian Telugu-language drama film, produced by M. Jaganatha Rao under the banner S.V.S. Films and directed by S. D. Lal. The film stars N. T. Rama Rao and Devika, with music composed by T. V. Raju. It is a remake of the 1966 Hindi film Phool Aur Patthar.

Plot
Raju is a valorous and straight shooter one unable to withstand any sort of injustice, for which he is frequently sentenced. Gazing at his caliber Seshu a felonious lures Raju in various forms to enroll him in his ring. Anyhow he does not yield. Raju lives in a colony where diverse communities of various mindsets stay together. Raju's appearance is dreadful to everyone therein. On the other side, Raghupathi a rich alcoholic lives with his upstanding daughter Susheela. To get hold of Raghupathi's property Veerabhadrayya a sly insnare him along with his virago wife Durgamma. Now they plan to knit Susheela with their deceased son.

Just before the nuptial, Raghupathi realizes the truth, and in that anger, he slays the groom and escapes. At present, Susheela is prisoned at Veerabhadrayya's house. Meanwhile, Seshu steals a necklace with the help of his sidekick Rosy and indicts Raju. Ultimately, he catches Rosy when Seshu's sidekick Dasu dies. Therefrom, threatened Raju becomes a puppet and turns into a huge burglar. Once, Raju enters Veerabhadraiah's house for robbery, where he spots Shankaram, the younger one of Veerabhadraiah molesting Susheela, he rescues and provides shelter to her. In her acquaintance, Raju reforms and also gain the admiration & affection of the colony.

Eventually, Chanti, the right-hand man to Raju breaks out the murder mystery of Dasu, by developing intimacy with his sister Chitti where Seshu's spiteful pawn moves backward. Enranged Seshu kidnaps Susheela who is fortunately spotted by hidden Raghupati. Being cognizant of it, Raju also onslaughts on Seshu, and protects Susheela. Here, sadly Rosy sacrifices her life while guarding Raju. Raghupati slaughters Seshu and flies. Right now, Raju is admitted before the judiciary for both crimes. At last, Raghupathi surrenders himself and acquits Raju. Before leaving, he unites Raju & Susheela. Finally, the movie ends on a happy note with the colony giving a warm welcome to the couple.

Cast
N. T. Rama Rao as Raju
Devika as Susheela
Rajanala as Seshu 
Satyanarayana as Rangaiah 
Ramana Reddy as Veerabhadraiah 
Allu Ramalingaiah as TB Patient
Raja Babu as Chanti
Dhulipala as Raghupati 
M. Balaiah as Lawyer 
Prabhakar Reddy as Nagulu
Raavi Kondala Rao
Ch. Krishna Murthy
Vanisri as Chitti 
L. Vijayalakshmi as Rosy      
Chaya Devi as Durgamma

Soundtrack 
Music composed by T. V. Raju.

References

External links

1960s Telugu-language films
1967 drama films
Films directed by S. D. Lal
Films scored by T. V. Raju
Indian drama films
Telugu remakes of Hindi films